Ena is a village in the Indian state of Gujarat located in Surat District, (Tahsil Palsana), near Bardoli.

See also 
List of tourist attractions in Surat
Since,2022 Ena,Gujarat is developed.

External links
 "Indian Census of villages"
 "Playing it big in little Ena" IBNLive

Suburban area of Surat
Villages in Surat district